Leptotrophon wareni is a species of sea snail, a marine gastropod mollusk, in the family Muricidae, the murex snails or rock snails.

Distribution
This species occurs off Papua New Guinea. and the Solomon Islands at depthst between 570 m and 756 m.

References

 Houart R. & Héros V. (2016). New species and records of deep water muricids (Gastropoda: Muricidae) from Papua New Guinea. Vita Malacologica. 15: 7-34

External links
 Houart R. & Héros V. (2012) New species of Muricidae (Gastropoda) and additional or noteworthy records from the western Pacific. Zoosystema 34(1): 21-37

wareni
Gastropods described in 2012